Mamiz Ab (also Romanized as Mamīz Āb; also known as Mahīz Āb, Mamīzā, Mazmāgerd, and Mazmāgird) is a village in Bagh-e Keshmir Rural District, Salehabad County, Razavi Khorasan Province, Iran. At the 2006 census, its population was 982, in 216 families.

References 

Populated places in   Torbat-e Jam County